Bovington Camp is a British Army military base in Dorset, England. Together with Lulworth Camp it forms part of Bovington Garrison.

The garrison is home to The Armour Centre and contains two barracks complexes and two forest and heathland training areas that support Phase Two training for soldiers of the Royal Armoured Corps and trade training for the Household Cavalry Regiment as well as other armoured units. It also houses The Tank Museum on its property.

History

The camps at Bovington and Lulworth were originally established in 1899 as an infantry training area and ranges. In 1916, they became training camps for the Heavy Branch of the Machine Gun Corps which relocated from Norfolk. The Heavy Branch was responsible for the operation of the tank in the British Army. In 1917 the Heavy Branch split from the Machine Gun Corps to become the Tank Corps, with the Depot and Central Schools being based at Bovington.

In 1937 the Central Schools became the Armoured Fighting Vehicles School, with driving and maintenance training at Bovington and gunnery at Lulworth.  The School became known as the Royal Armoured Corps Centre in 1947, now renamed The Armour Centre.

Resident units
The camp is home to:

Ministry of Defence

 Defence Support Group

British Army
Headquarters, Royal Armoured Corps
Regimental Headquarters, Royal Wessex Yeomanry, at Allenby Barracks
Regimental Headquarters, Royal Tank Regiment, at Stanley Barracks
Armoured Trials and Development Unit
The Armour Centre
Combat Communication Information Systems (CIS) School
Armoured Fighting Vehicle Training Group
Royal Armoured Corps Training Regiment, at Allenby Barracks
Armoured Fighting Vehicle Schools Regiment
Armoured Fighting Vehicle School of Communications, Driving & Maintenance
Armoured Fighting Vehicle School of Gunnery, at Lulworth Camp
Royal Navy
Royal Navy Centre of Recruiting
Royal Navy School of Recruiting
Royal Marines Armoured Support Group, at Stanley Barracks

Training
Soldiers and Officers attend stage 2 training at the Armoured Fighting Vehicle Training Group following initial training and undertake courses in gunnery, signals, driving, vehicle maintenance and tactics.  The centre also provides through career, and promotion, training for soldiers and officers. The group delivers course through three operating sections; Communications, Gunnery and Driving & Maintenance.  The majority of this training is delivered at Bovington Camp with live gunnery activities taking place at nearby Lulworth Ranges.

References

External links
Armour Centre, Bovington

Villages in Dorset
Training establishments of the British Army
Installations of the British Army
Barracks in England
Military training areas in the United Kingdom